Guardian Egyptian is a slab-serif typeface commissioned by Mark Porter for the UK newspaper The Guardian and designed by Paul Barnes and Christian Schwartz between 2004 and 2005 and published by their company Commercial Type.

It was an essential element in The Guardian's move to the Berliner format and was the typeface used in the masthead until 2018. It is part of the Guardian font family, which also includes Guardian Sans, Guardian Text Egyptian, Guardian Text Sans and Guardian Agate, all of which are also used by The Guardian.

References

External links

Guardian Egyptian Headline available for licensing at Commercial Type (Weights: Hairline, Thin, Light, Regular, Medium, Semibold, Bold, Black (with italics).)
All Typefaces in Guardian Font Family available at Commercial Type

Slab serif typefaces
The Guardian
Typefaces with optical sizes
Typefaces designed by Christian Schwartz
Typefaces designed by Paul Barnes
Corporate typefaces